Syllepte berambalis is a moth in the family Crambidae. It was described by Schaus in 1927. It is found in the Philippines (Mindanao).

References

Moths described in 1927
Moths of the Philippines
berambalis
Taxa named by William Schaus